The Emsco B-8 was a two-seat, single-engine, low-wing, twin boom experimental aircraft designed by Charles F. Rocheville in 1930 while he was vice president of Emsco Aircraft Corporation, Long Beach, California.

Development
Rocheville sought for a safe, fool-proof airplane with exceptional range, endurance, and payload. The aircraft, registered NX55W, first flew on 17 April 1930.

By June 1930 it had been fitted with a  Pratt & Whitney R-985 Wasp Junior nine-cylinder radial engine. Development ended in November 1930 because of lack of funds and the B-8 was scrapped.

Design
Despite its name 'Flying Wing' the aircraft carried a twin-boom empennage with a single vertical fin.  The two crew sat in open tandem cockpits in a central nacelle with circular cross-section, initially with a  Continental A-70 in tractor configuration.  The nacelle ended in a jet-engine like 'exhaust' nozzle at its rear, which actually  was an intake to a boundary-layer bleed system driven by the engine which blew air through spanwise slots in the rear part of the 'Flying Wing' in an attempt to increase the wing's performance.  Another unusual characteristic of the design was its “reversed tricycle landing gear” with two main wheels under the front wing and a single aft wheel under the rear-end of the nacelle.

Specifications (Emsco B-8)

See also

References

External links

Twin-boom aircraft
1930s United States experimental aircraft
Low-wing aircraft
Single-engined tractor aircraft
Aircraft first flown in 1930